Branko Pavlović (Бранко Павловић; born 11 June 1960) is a Serbian politician and lawyer. He was the leader of the list Branko Pavlović – "Because it has to be better" on 2007 Serbian parliamentary election that won no seats. Branko Pavlović was previously a member and vice-president of the Social Democratic Union which he had left.

External links
Initiative Serbia
 Branko Pavlović – "Because it has to be better" list of candidates for the parliamentary elections 2007

1960 births
Living people
Social Democratic Union (Serbia) politicians